The 2021 Campeonato Mineiro (officially Campeonato Mineiro SICOOB 2021 – Módulo I for sponsorship reasons) was the 107th edition of the state championship of Minas Gerais organized by the FMF. The competition began on 27 February and ended on 22 May 2021.

Due to the worsening of the COVID-19 pandemic in Brazil, FMF suspended the Campeonato Mineiro between 22 and 31 March 2021. The tournament resumed on 1 April 2021.

The defending champions Atlético Mineiro successfully defended their title winning their 46th Campeonato Mineiro.

Format

First stage
The 2021 Módulo I first stage was contested by 12 clubs in a single round-robin tournament. The four best-placed teams qualified for the final stage and the bottom two teams were relegated to the 2022 Módulo II.

The three best-placed teams not already qualified for the 2022 seasons of the Série A, Série B or Série C, gained berths in the 2022 Série D. The four best-placed teams qualified for the 2022 Copa do Brasil. If a team qualified for the Copa do Brasil by other means, its berth would be awarded to the Troféu Inconfidência champions.

Knockout stage
The knockout stage was played between the 4 best-placed teams from the previous stage in a two-legged tie. In the semifinals and finals, higher-seeded team earned the right to choose the order of the legs. The away goals rule would not be used, and if two teams tied on aggregate goals, higher-seeded team would advance.

Troféu Inconfidência
The Troféu Inconfidência was played between the 5th to 8th-placed teams from the previous stage. Originally, the Troféu Inconfidência would be played in a two-legged tie but, following an agreement with FMF, the qualified teams decided to play in a single-leg tie. In the semifinals and final, higher-seeded team hosted the leg. If the score was level, the match would go straight to the penalty shoot-out to determine the winners.

Participating teams

First stage

Troféu Inconfidência

Bracket

Knockout stage

Bracket

Semi-finals

Group F

Atlético Mineiro advanced to the finals.

Group G

América Mineiro advanced to the finals.

Finals

Tied 0–0 on aggregate, Atlético Mineiro were declared champions due to their best performance in the first stage.

Top goalscorers

References

External links
 Campeonato Mineiro Official Website

Campeonato Mineiro seasons
Mineiro
Campeonato Mineiro